Lash Kenar (also Romanized as Lash Kenār) is a village in Mian Band Rural District, in the Central District of Nur County, Mazandaran Province, Iran. At the 2006 census, its population was 126, in 30 families.

References 

Populated places in Nur County